This Is Me is the first studio album by British singer/songwriter and actress Heather Peace.  It is completely acoustic consisting of just Heather and her white Gretsch guitar.  It consists of 9 tracks: 5 covers and 4 original songs.

Track list 
 Ain't No Sunshine
 I Will Make a Wish
 You Do Something To Me
 It's About Love
 Thank God For You
 I Can't Make You Love Me
 Human Nature
 Never Been a Girl Like You
 Hallelujah

2010 albums